The Mitsubishi ESR (Ecological Science Research) is a hybrid electric vehicle (HEV) concept exhibited by Mitsubishi Motors at the 30th Tokyo Motor Show in 1993. It was designed to demonstrate the company's technological developments in alternative energy, and used a 70 kW AC induction motor to drive the front wheels. 28 alkaline batteries housed under the passenger compartment, and a rear-mounted 1.5-litre gasoline engine powered an onboard electrical generator system. It also recycled its own kinetic energy, and absorbed solar power through roof-mounted cells.

A Global Positioning System (GPS) receiver could automatically switch the vehicle from hybrid to battery-only operation when entering an urban area.

References

ESR